The 2019–20 season is Urartu's nineteenth consecutive season in the Armenian Premier League.

Season events
On 2 August 2019, FC Banants was officially renamed Urartu FC.

On 24 November, Ilshat Fayzulin resigned as manager, with Aleksandr Grigoryan being announced as his replacement the same day.

On 6 December 2019, Aram Bareghamyan and Edward Kpodo signed new contracts with Urartu.

On 13 January, Aram Ayrapetyan left Urartu.

On 13 February, Narek Petrosyan left Urartu by mutual agreement.

On 12 March 2020, the Football Federation of Armenia announced that all Armenian Premier League games had been postponed until 23 March, and that the Armenian Cup Semifinal second legs had also been postponed due to the COVID-19 pandemic.

Squad

Transfers

In

Loans in

Out

Loans out

Released

Friendlies

Competitions

Armenian Premier League

Regular season

Results summary

Results

Table

Relegation round

Results summary

Results

Table

Armenian Cup

UEFA Europa League

Qualifying rounds

Statistics

Appearances and goals

|-
|colspan="16"|Players away on loan:
|-
|colspan="16"|Players who left Urartu during the season:

|}

Goal scorers

Clean sheets

Disciplinary record

References

FC Urartu seasons
Banants
Urartu